Danny Schofield, known professionally as DannyBoyStyles (and previously known as Styles), is a Grammy award-winning record producer, engineer, songwriter, and composer.  He produced all ten tracks on the Weeknd's album Kiss Land and won a Grammy for his work on the Weeknd's follow-up, Beauty Behind the Madness.

Early life and career 
Schofield was born and raised in Miami, Florida. His first hit as a producer was "This Is Why I'm Hot" for Mims in 2007, which would go on to peak at #1 on the Billboard Hot 100. He also produced most of the other songs on Mims' Music Is My Savior album as part of DJ Blackout's Blackout Movement. A few years later, he was introduced to Amir "Cash" Esmailian and Tony Sal, co-managers to the Weeknd and Canadian rapper Belly. He would go on to produce all 10 tracks on the Weeknd's debut studio album Kiss Land which was released in September 2013. He won his first Grammy for his work on the Weeknd's Beauty Behind the Madness which included production and songwriting work on "Often", "Acquainted", and "Angel."

In October 2013, he joined Ben Billions and Belly to co-write "6 Inch" for Beyoncé featuring the Weeknd. The song would eventually appear on Lemonade which was nominated for Album of the Year at the 2017 Grammy Awards and won for Best Urban Contemporary Album. DannyBoyStyles is also a frequent collaborator with The Weeknd and Belly and has produced or written songs for a variety of artists including French Montana, NAV, and Juicy J.

Songwriting and production discography

Albums

Songs

References

External links

Songwriters from Florida
Record producers from Florida
Year of birth missing (living people)
Living people